Banksia rufistylis is a species of column-shaped shrub that is endemic to Western Australia. It has linear leaves with sharply-pointed serrations, cream-coloured flowers with a red style arranged in heads of about forty, and egg-shaped follicles with a flattened tip.

Description
Banksia rufistylis is a column-shaped shrub that typically grows to a height of  but does not form a lignotuber. The flowers are arranged in sessile heads of between thirty-five and forty.

Taxonomy and naming
This species was first formally described in 1996 by Alex George who gave it the name Dryandra rufistylis and published the description in the journal Nuytsia from material he collected near Woodanilling. In 2007 Austin Mast and Kevin Thiele transferred all dryandras to the genus Banksia and renamed this species Banksia rufistylis.

Distribution and habitat
Banksia rufistylis grows in kwongan and woodland between the Woodanilling, Nyabing and Tarin Rock districts.

Conservation status
This banksia is classified as "Priority Two" by the Western Australian Government Department of Parks and Wildlife meaning that it is poorly known and from only one or a few locations.

References

rufistylis
Plants described in 1996
Taxa named by Alex George